Marion Township is a civil township of Charlevoix County in the U.S. state of Michigan. The population was 1,714 at the 2010 census.

Communities
It began as early as 1866 when the area was originally part of Emmet County until Charlevoix County was established in 1869. The community developed around a sawmill operated by Barnard Burns, who also served as the first postmaster when a post office opened on June 29, 1866. The post office operated until May 2, 1881.
Cherrie is a former settlement along the Chicago and Western Michigan Railroad that formed around the train station in 1892.  Cherrie appeared in Marion Township on a 1911 map of Charlevoix County. 
The community began with a sawmill and was first called Ballou's Siding. A post office named Phelps opened on April 30, 1900 but is no longer in operation.

Geography

The township has a small northeastern coastline along Lake Charlevoix.

Major highways
  enters very briefly in the northwestern corner of the township.
  runs through the northeast portion of the township near Lake Charlevoix. 
  is a county-designated highway that runs south–north through the center of the township.

Demographics
As of the census of 2000, there were 1,492 people, 535 households, and 418 families residing in the township. There were 632 housing units at an average density of 24.7 per square mile (9.5/km2). The racial makeup of the township was 95.44% White, 0.20% African American, 0.74% Native American, 0.13% Asian, 0.47% Pacific Islander, 0.94% from other races, and 2.08% from two or more races. Hispanic or Latino of any race were 2.68% of the population.

There were 535 households, out of which 39.1% had children under the age of 18 living with them, 69.0% were married couples living together, 5.8% had a female householder with no husband present, and 21.7% were non-families. 18.5% of all households were made up of individuals, and 7.9% had someone living alone who was 65 years of age or older.  The average household size was 2.76 and the average family size was 3.14.

In the township the population was spread out, with 31.4% under the age of 18, 5.0% from 18 to 24, 28.2% from 25 to 44, 26.1% from 45 to 64, and 9.3% who were 65 years of age or older.  The median age was 37 years. For every 100 females, there were 97.9 males.  For every 100 females age 18 and over, there were 101.0 males.

The median income for a household in the township was $40,694, and the median income for a family was $45,903. Males had a median income of $35,417 versus $21,905 for females. The per capita income for the township was $16,854.  About 5.2% of families and 6.8% of the population were below the poverty line, including 8.2% of those under age 18 and 6.2% of those age 65 or over.

Education
Marion Township is served almost entirely by Charlevoix Public Schools to the north in the city of Charlevoix, while a very small portion of the southern edge of the township is served by Ellsworth Community School in the village of Ellsworth to the south in Antrim County.

References

Sources

Townships in Charlevoix County, Michigan
Townships in Michigan